Russ 'Rusty' Keaulana (born 6 March 1966, in Oahu, Hawaii) is an American professional longboard surfrider.

Rusty is the son of legendary Hawaiian waterman Richard "Buffalo" Keaulana. He won 3 World Longboard Championships in a row in 1993, 1994 and 1995. In 2010, he entered as a wildcard in an ASP world tour event in Makaha and reached the semifinals. He is renowned as a switchfooter, able to surf with either foot forward. His brother Brian Keaulana is also a notable surfer and is a world-class lifeguard.

Filmography
Keaulana has appeared in about 20 surf movies and videos. In 1999, he starred in the Guinness advertisement Surfer.

References

1966 births
American surfers
Sportspeople from Hawaii
People from Honolulu County, Hawaii
Living people